"I Got the Wherewithal" is the debut single by British group Theaudience, released on 27 October 1997. The song peaked at No. 170 on the UK Singles Chart. The single was also issued in America as an EP in 1998. The B-sides for the single include "Outside; Out of Space", which is an acoustic re-working of "Running Out of Space" from the group's debut album Theaudience, "Helen & Polly", an instrumental reworking of "I Got the Wherewithal" focusing mostly on the string arrangement, and "Je Suis Content", a cover of a Jacques Dutronc song.

Track listings
 UK CD single (AUDCD1)
 "I Got the Wherewithal" – 3:51
 "Je Suis Content" – 2:38
 "Outside; Out of Space" – 3:58
 "Helen and Polly" – 3:46

 UK Limited Edition Vinyl (AUDVN1)
 "I Got the Wherewithal" – 3:51
 "Je Suis Content" – 2:38

 American E.P. (314 538 164-2)
 "I Got the Wherewithal" – 3:51
 "Penis Size and Cars" – 2:57
 "Ne Jamais Decu" – 3:36
 "Ten Minutes Which Improved My Life" – 9:25
 "There Are Worse Things I Could Do" – 2:19
 "The Beginning, The Middle & The End" – 8:20

References

1997 songs
1997 debut singles
Theaudience songs
Mercury Records singles
Songs written by Billy Reeves